Dying of Laughter is a 1999 Spanish black comedy film co-written and directed by Álex de la Iglesia which stars Santiago Segura, El Gran Wyoming and Álex Angulo.

Plot 
The plot tracks the mishaps of a comedic duo formed by Nino and Bruno who actually hate each other.

Cast

Production 
Produced by Lola Films and featuring the participation of Telecinco, the film had a budget of 350 million Spanish peseta.

Release 
The film, which premiered on 12 March 1999 in Spain, grossed €6,299,097.15 at the box office.

Awards and nominations 

|-
| align = "center" | 2000 || 14th Goya Awards || Best Supporting Actor || Álex Angulo ||  || 
|}

See also 
 List of Spanish films of 1999

References 
Citations

Bibliography

External links 

1999 films
1990s black comedy films
1990s Spanish-language films
Spanish black comedy films
Films directed by Álex de la Iglesia
Films scored by Roque Baños
Films with screenplays by Jorge Guerricaechevarría
1999 comedy films
LolaFilms films
1990s Spanish films